The Peninsula Manila (colloquially Manila Pen or simply Manila Peninsula), is a 5-star luxury hotel in the Philippines. It is located on the corner of Ayala Avenue and Makati Avenue in the Makati Central Business District. It is located also in Barangay Urdaneta. This hotel is part of The Peninsula Hotels chain based in Hong Kong and is the first hotel of that chain outside the Chinese territory.

History 
The Peninsula Manila was built to coincide with the hosting of the International Monetary Fund conference in Manila. It was built on the corners of Ayala and Makati Avenues, after which they are named. In 1994 the hotel was renovated, with a new fountain and some of the hotels walls was painted new colors

The Pen consists of two wings, which host all 497 rooms and suites.

In 2000, the hotel's fountain area, fronting the corner of Ayala and Makati Avenues, was the scene of Filipino singer Regine Velasquez for her performance of the country's millennial theme Written In The Sand together with 2,000 children, televised in 67 broadcast networks throughout the world to coincide with midnight in Manila for the BBC's millennium special 2000 Today.

Manila Peninsula Siege

The Manila Peninsula rebellion occurred on November 29, 2007. Detained Senator Antonio Trillanes IV, General Danilo Lim and other Magdalo officials walked out of their trial and marched through the streets of Makati, called for the ousting of President Gloria Macapagal Arroyo, and seized the second floor of The Peninsula Manila along Ayala Avenue. Former Vice-President Teofisto Guingona also joined the march to The Peninsula Manila Hotel as well as some of the soldiers from the Armed Forces of the Philippines.
The siege was ended after the military stormed the lobby and the second floor where Rizal function room was located and Trillanes was seized.

The lobby of the hotel sustained much damage because of gunfire that rattled through its walls, windows and the main glass door was obliterated by an armored personnel carrier on the assault to serve Trillanes et al. their arrest warrants.

On December 4, 2007, David Batchelor, general manager of the hotel, announced the filing of damage suit within 10 days, as some estimated the damage at US$1.2 million or P 50.766 million. Meanwhile, even before the reopening, it already received guests’ bookings or 51% room occupancy. The Peninsula Manila is 77% owned by the Hongkong and Shanghai Hotels Limited.

See also 
 The Peninsula Hotels
 The Peninsula Hong Kong
 The Peninsula Tokyo
 The Peninsula Bangkok

References

External links 
 

Hotels in Metro Manila
Hotels established in 1976
Hotel buildings completed in 1976
Manila
Buildings and structures in Makati
1976 establishments in the Philippines